This list of tallest buildings in the Indian subcontinent (South Asia) ranks skyscrapers and structures in Bangladesh, Bhutan, India, Maldives, Nepal, Pakistan, and Sri Lanka, based upon height.

Tallest buildings

This list ranks buildings in the Indian subcontinent that have achieved a height of at least . Only completed buildings and under construction buildings that have topped out  are included .This includes spires and architectural details but does not include antenna masts.

Tallest structures
This is a list of the tallest structures in South Asia, including all types of structures that stand at least 300 metres tall.

 South of INS Kattabomman, there are two radio masts with an umbrella antenna situated at 8.378479 N 77.744043 E and 8.375069 N 77.755834 E.

Tallest city 

This is a list of cities in the Indian subcontinent by their number of high-rise buildings and Skyscrapers.

Tallest buildings under construction

This list ranks buildings that are under construction in South Asia and are planned to rise at least  or 60 floors.

Timeline of tallest buildings in the Subcontinent

See also 

 List of tallest buildings in Asia
 List of tallest buildings and structures in Afghanistan
 List of tallest buildings in Bangladesh
 List of tallest buildings in India
 List of tallest buildings in Pakistan
 List of tallest structures in Sri Lanka

References

External links 
 Diagram of India's Skyscrapers - Current, Proposed, and Under Construction

All articles with unsourced statements
India